The Department of Finance is a key ministry that manages the state finances and economy of the State of Kerala. The department is headed by a senior minister who has cabinet ranking as per Indian Cabinet Protocol Laws. The state assembly rules of 1966 ranks the department and its minister as number 3 in official rankings after Chief Minister and Opposition Leader.

The finance department manages and regulates the state economy and finances through taxation, financial legislation, financial institutions, capital markets, center and state finances, and the State Budget.

History

The British Resident and Dewan, Col. John Munro, and Her Highness Rani Lakshmi Bai, as part of their reform and modernization of Kerala's administration between 1811 and 1814, had framed some of the major departments of the Secretariat like Finance, Revenue, Police, etc. A Peshkar (Secretary of the State) was appointed to manage state finances.

In the course of legislative developments in 1865, the foundation stone was laid for the Secretariat building by His Highness Ayilyam Thirunal Majaraja. The Secretariat began to function from 23 August 1869. Earlier, the Secretariat was known as Huzur Cutchery, Public Office or Puthen Kacheri.  The Finance Department, ever since, has played a major role in governance.  (The Secretariat later came to be known as ‘Government Secretariat’, from 25 August 1949, by virtue of Circular no. M3-5412/49/CS).

Unlike other Indian states, Revenue functions of Finance department is separated from the department and maintained as an independent department with another senior cabinet ranking minister, heading the portfolio. This was primarily because of Kerala’s long history in keep state revenues as an independent department during monarchical days.  During Monarchical days in Kochi and Travancore Kingdoms, most of the land are owned by Royal governments, which has been leased to feudal lords, planters, industrialists, temple bodies and religious congregations for carrying out economic activities in return for fixed revenue. Prior to forming finance department, it was Pandara (also pronounced as Bhandra Dept- Malayalam name of Revenue dept) managing state finances. When separate finance department was formed to formulate state financial policies, expenditure controls, investment opportunities and controlling fiscal deficits, the tax collection and revenue remained as a separate body itself.

Functions
Major functions of the Finance Department include the following
Framing of rules regulating the pay, leave and pension of persons in the service of the Government and rules regulating the number, gradings or cadre and emoluments of posts under the Government and also be responsible for seeing that these rules are properly applied.
Finance Department is responsible for all matters relative to financial procedure and the application of the principles of sound finance.
Advise on the financial aspect of all transactions relating to loans granted by the Government.
Safety and proper employment of Famine Relief Fund and other special funds, if any, and for the administration of Provident Funds, Deposits and Advances.
Examine and report on all proposals for the imposition, increase, reduction or abolition of taxes, duties, cesses or fees.
Examine and report on all proposals for borrowing or giving of a guarantee by the Government and raise such loans as have been duly authorised,  Finance Department shall be in charge of all matters relating to the service of loans or the discharge of guarantees.
Ensure that proper financial rules are framed for the guidance of other departments and that suitable accounts, including commercial accounts, whatever necessary, are maintained by other departments and establishments subordinate to them.
Prepare an estimate of the total receipts and disbursements of the State in each year and watching the state of the Government's balances and for their ways and means operations.
Preparation of Budgets and supplementary estimates.
Advise departments responsible for the collection of revenue regarding the progress of collection and methods of collection employed.

About Department 

The Department is managed by a senior Minister who has a Cabinet ranking. The Current minister is Sri.K.N.Balagopal. The department is assisted by Finance Secretary and 14 additional secretaries.

Sub departments

Department of Finance has following sub-departments;
 
 Expenditures 
  Budget 
 Resources
The Following are classified as line departments of DOF, in which they have direct control

 National Savings Department
 Treasuries Department
 Local Fund Audit Department
 State Insurance Department

The Department of Finance also controls Kerala Financial Corporation, an important agency in leading finance and credit for industrial and agricultural projects for private and public.

The Finance Department controls the major functions like Stores & Purchase, Commercial Taxes, Agricultural Income Tax, Treasuries, Lotteries, Local Fund Audit, Financial Enterprises, State Insurance, Stamps & Stamp Duties etc.

References
 https://web.archive.org/web/20060118031516/http://www.kerala.gov.in/ (Official website of Govt. of Kerala)

Finance
Government finances in Kerala